Max Josef Lowe (born 11 May 1997) is an English professional footballer who plays for EFL Championship club Sheffield United. He has represented England at under-16, under-17, under-18 and under-20 level.

Club career

Derby County
Lowe came through the Derby County academy, and was an unused substitute for the first team on 2 October 2013, as Derby drew 4–4 with Ipswich Town. He went on to turn professional at the club in June 2015. However, he missed much of the 2015–16 season with a hamstring injury. He made his professional debut on 23 August 2016, in a 1–1 draw with Carlisle United in the second round of the EFL Cup at Pride Park Stadium; he converted his penalty in the resulting shoot-out, which Derby won 14–13.
On 27 September 2016, Lowe made his League debut in an away game to Cardiff City.

Lowe joined League One side Shrewsbury Town on a half-season loan in January 2018.

He was then loaned to Scottish Premiership club Aberdeen in August 2018, on a deal which ran until January 2019. After playing in two games for Derby during January, Lowe returned to Aberdeen on loan for the rest of the 2018–19 season.

Sheffield United
On 7 September 2020, Sheffield United announced the signing of Lowe on a four-year contract. Lowe made his debut in the EFL Cup in a 5-4 penalty loss to Burnley. His Premier League debut, against Fulham in United's fifth league fixture of the season, lasted only 19 minutes after he had to be withdrawn following a concussion. Lowe came back into the side at left wing-back in defeats to Man City, Chelsea, West Ham and West Brom which left United stranded at the foot of the table with one point from their opening ten fixtures; Wilder admitted that Lowe was starting games "too early" and local media suggesting he looked "lost" and "could quickly find himself sinking without a trace." Following defeat to Leicester City, in which Lowe was booked and subbed at half time, he lost his place in the team, only making two more league appearances (one start, one as substitute) between December and March. As a whole, Lowe made the matchday squad 33 times as Sheffield United were relegated back to the Championship after two seasons, but featured just eight times, with seven appearances from the start, and was fourth-choice full back, leading to suggestions he could leave the club.

On 27 August 2021, Lowe joined Championship side Nottingham Forest on loan for the remainder of the season. on June 10, 2022, Forest announced that Lowe would return to his parent club once the loan had expired.

International career
Lowe featured in the qualifying round of the 2014 UEFA European Under-17 Championship for the England under-17s, playing in the 6–0 win over the Republic of Ireland at the Vazgen Sargsyan Republican Stadium on 29 October 2013.

He was called up to the England under-18 team in September 2014 and the England under-20 team in August 2016.

In May 2019, Lowe returned to the international fold by being included in the England U20 squad for the 2019 Toulon Tournament.

Career statistics

Honours
Shrewsbury Town
EFL Trophy: Runner-up 2017–18

Aberdeen
Scottish League Cup runner-up: 2018–19
Nottingham Forest
EFL Championship play-offs: 2022

References

External links
Profile at Soccerbase
England profile at The FA

1997 births
Living people
Footballers from Derby
Black British sportspeople
English footballers
England youth international footballers
Association football fullbacks
Association football midfielders
Derby County F.C. players
Shrewsbury Town F.C. players
Sheffield United F.C. players
Nottingham Forest F.C. players
English Football League players
People from South Normanton
Footballers from Derbyshire
Aberdeen F.C. players
Scottish Professional Football League players
Premier League players